Saigolabad is a small town in Chakwal District, Punjab, Pakistan.

Populated places in Chakwal District